In mathematics, a Maharam algebra is a complete Boolean algebra with a continuous submeasure (defined below).

Definitions

A continuous submeasure or Maharam submeasure  on a Boolean algebra is a real-valued function m such that
  and  if .
 If , then .
 .
 If  is a decreasing sequence with greatest lower bound 0, then the sequence  has limit 0.

A Maharam algebra is a complete Boolean algebra with a continuous submeasure.

Examples

Every probability measure is a continuous submeasure, so as the corresponding Boolean algebra of measurable sets modulo measure zero sets is complete, it is a Maharam algebra.

 solved a long-standing problem by constructing a Maharam algebra that is not a measure algebra, i.e., that does not admit any countably additive strictly positive finite measure.

References

 

Boolean algebra